Beebe Windmill is a historic mill located at the southeast corner of Ocean Road and Hildreth Avenue in Bridgehampton, New York.

History
Beebe windmill was built in 1820 at Sag Harbor for Lester Beebe. Built on the wharf, it was moved to Sherrills Hill (Oakland Cemetery) where it also served as notifier to the town of arriving whaleship.After his death, it was bought by Rose Gelston who had it moved to Bridgehampton where it worked for more than 50 years. In 1882, it was bought by James Sanford and moved to a site south of the railroad. Later, a steam engine was installed to provide power when the wind was not blowing. In 1888, the mill was repaired by millwright Nathaniel Dominy of Long Island. It was moved to a site north of the railroad in 1889. It was operated here until 1915 by the Bridgehampton Milling Company. In that year, it was bought by John E. Berwind and moved to his summer estate, Minden.

It is described in a 1977 Historic American Engineering Record (HAER) description as "one of the first Long Island windmills to have a fly, regulators, and cast iron gears" and is the only one with its original versions of those.  It is also the only Long Island windmill to have a "decorative" design. With these features it is "the only surviving Long Island windmill which compares to English windmills of the same period." The windmill was added to the National Register of Historic Places in 1978.

Description

Beebe windmill is a four-story smock mill with an ogee cap winded by a fantail. Four Common sails are carried on a wooden windshaft, as is the wooden clasp arm brake wheel. This drives a cast iron wallower carried at the top of the upright shaft. At its lower end the cast iron great spur wheel drives two pairs of overdrift millstones.

References

External links

Smock mills in the United States
Agricultural buildings and structures on the National Register of Historic Places in New York (state)
Historic American Engineering Record in New York (state)
Industrial buildings completed in 1820
Southampton (town), New York
Windmills in New York (state)
Buildings and structures in Suffolk County, New York
Octagonal buildings in the United States
National Register of Historic Places in Suffolk County, New York
Windmills on the National Register of Historic Places